MoBo Presents: The Perfect Cast EP Featuring Modern Baseball is the second EP by rock band Modern Baseball.

Background 
On October 23, 2015, Modern Baseball released MOBO Presents: The Perfect Cast EP featuring Modern Baseball via Lame-O Records. The album was the first after a long wait since the band's previous full-length album You're Gonna Miss It All. Two singles were released from the album ("Revenge of the Nameless Ranger" and "The Thrash Particle").

PunkNews gave the album 4 out of 5 stars, describing the sound like a bridge between the band's first two studio albums.

Track listing

Personnel 
 Modern Baseball
 Bren Lukens – vocals, guitar
 Jake Ewald – vocals, guitar
 Ian Farmer – bass, vocals
 Sean Huber – drums, vocals
 Others
 Produced – Modern Baseball 
 Engineers – Jacob Ewald, Ian Farmer
 Mix – Matt Schimelfenig 
 Mastered – Ryan Schwabe
 Artwork – Beau Brynes 
 Photography – Jessica Flynn 
 Calligraphy – Perry Shall
Additional Lyrics – Cameron Boucher 
Tambourine – Andrew Dole

References

2015 EPs
Modern Baseball albums
Lame-O Records albums